Chorsu Bazaar , also called charsu bazaar, is the traditional bazaar located in the center of the old town of Tashkent, the capital city of Uzbekistan. Under its blue-colored domed building and the adjacent areas, all daily necessities are sold.

Overview
Chorsu Bazaar is located across the street from Chorsu Station of the Tashkent Metro, near Kukeldosh Madrasah. "Chorsu" is a word from the Persian language, meaning "crossroads" or "four streams".   Kukeldash Madrasah, built around 1570, is located at the edge of the bazaar. The modern building and the characteristic blue dome were designed by Vladimir Azimov, Sabir Adylov et al. in 1980, as a late example of Soviet Modernism style.

See also

 Bazaar
 Chorsu (Samarkand)
 Market (place)
 Retail 
 Siyob Bazaar (Samarkand)

References

Bazaars
Buildings and structures in Tashkent
Retail markets in Uzbekistan
Tourist attractions in Tashkent